

From 5,000 to 5,999 

 
 
 
 
 
 
 
 
 
 
 5010 Amenemhêt
 5011 Ptah
 5012 Eurymedon
 
 
 
 
 
 
 
 
 
 
 5023 Agapenor
 
 5025 Mecisteus
 5026 Martes
 5027 Androgeos
 5028 Halaesus
 
 
 
 
 
 
 
 
 
 
 
 5040 Rabinowitz
 5041 Theotes
 
 
 
 
 
 
 
 
 
 
 
 
 
 
 
 
 
 
 
 
 
 
 
 
 
 
 
 
 
 
 
 
 
 
 
 
 
 
 5080 Oja
 
 
 
 
 
 
 
 5088 Tancredi
 
 
 
 
 
 
 
 
 
 
 
 
 5101 Akhmerov
 
 
 
 
 
 
 
 
 
 
 
 
 
 
 
 
 
 5119 Imbrius
 5120 Bitias
 
 
 
 
 
 5126 Achaemenides
 
 
 
 5130 Ilioneus
 
 
 
 
 
 
 
 
 
 
 
 5143 Heracles
 5144 Achates
 5145 Pholus
 
 
 5148 Giordano
 
 
 
 
 
 
 
 
 
 
 
 5160 Camoes
 
 
 
 
 
 
 
 
 
 
 5171 Augustesen
 
 
 
 5175 Ables
 5176 Yoichi
 
 
 
 
 
 
 
 
 5185 Alerossi
 
 
 
 
 
 
 
 
 
 5196 Bustelli
 
 
 
 
 5201 Ferraz-Mello
 
 
 
 
 
 
 5208 Royer
 
 
 
 
 
 
 
 
 
 
 
 
 
 5222 Ioffe
 
 
 
 
 
 
 
 
 
 
 
 
 
 
 
 
 
 
 
 
 
 5244 Amphilochos
 
 
 
 
 
 
 
 
 
 5254 Ulysses
 
 5256 Farquhar
 
 5258 Rhoeo
 5259 Epeigeus
 
 5261 Eureka
 
 
 5264 Telephus
 
 
 
 
 
 
 
 
 
 
 
 
 
 
 
 
 
 
 5283 Pyrrhus
 5284 Orsilocus
 5285 Krethon
 
 
 
 
 
 
 
 
 
 
 
 
 
 
 
 
 
 
 
 
 
 
 
 
 
 
 
 
 
 
 5316 Filatov
 
 5318 Dientzenhofer
 
 
 
 
 
 
 
 
 
 
 
 
 5331 Erimomisaki
 
 5333 Kanaya
 
 5335 Damocles
 
 
 
 
 
 
 
 
 
 
 
 
 
 
 
 
 
 
 
 
 
 5357 Sekiguchi
 
 
 
 
 
 
 
 
 
 
 
 
 5370 Taranis
 
 
 
 
 
 
 5380 Sprigg
 5381 Sekhmet
 
 
 
 5385 Kamenka
 
 
 
 
 
 5391 Emmons
 
 
 
 
 
 
 
 
 
 
 
 
 
 
 
 
 
 
 
 
 
 
 
 
 
 
 
 
 
 
 5426 Sharp
 
 5430 Luu
 
 
 
 
 
 5436 Eumelos
 
 
 
 
 
 
 
 
 
 
 
 
 
 
 
 
 
 
 
 
 
 
 
 
 
 
 
 
 
 
 5474 Gingasen
 5475 Hanskennedy
 5476 Mulius
 5477 Holmes
 
 
 5481 Kiuchi
 
 
 
 
 
 
 
 
 
 
 
 
 
 
 
 
 
 
 
 
 
 
 5511 Cloanthus
 
 
 
 
 
 
 
 
 
 
 
 
 
 
 
 
 
 
 5535 Annefrank
 
 
 
 
 
 
 5542 Moffatt
 
 
 
 
 
 
 
 
 
 
 
 
 
 
 
 
 
 
 
 
 
 
 
 
 
 
 
 
 
 
 
 
 
 
 
 
 
 
 
 
 
 
 5592 Oshima
 
 
 
 
 
 
 
 
 
 
 
 
 
 
 
 
 
 
 
 
 
 
 
 
 
 
 
 
 
 
 
 
 
 
 5635 Cole
 
 
 5638 Deikoon
 
 
 5641 McCleese
 5642 Bobbywilliams
 
 
 
 5648 Axius
 
 
 
 5652 Amphimachus
 5653 Camarillo
 
 5655 Barney
 5656 Oldfield
 
 
 
 
 
 
 
 
 
 
 
 
 
 
 
 
 
 
 5677 Aberdonia
 
 
 
 
 5682 Beresford
 
 
 
 
 
 
 
 
 5692 Shirao
 
 
 
 
 
 
 
 
 
 
 
 
 
 
 
 
 
 
 
 
 
 
 
 
 
 
 
 
 
 
 
 5731 Zeus
 
 
 
 
 
 
 
 
 
 
 
 
 
 
 5751 Zao
 
 5756 Wassenbergh
 
 
 
 
 
 
 
 
 
 
 
 
 5771 Somerville
 
 
 
 
 
 
 
 
 
 
 
 
 
 5786 Talos
 
 
 
 
 
 
 
 
 
 
 
 
 
 
 
 
 
 5806 Archieroy
 
 
 
 
 
 
 
 
 
 
 
 
 
 
 
 
 
 
 
 
 
 
 
 
 
 
 
 
 
 
 
 
 
 
 
 
 
 
 
 5855 Yukitsuna
 
 
 
 
 
 
 
 
 
 
 
 
 
 
 
 
 
 
 
 
 
 
 
 
 
 
 
 
 
 
 
 
 
 
 
 
 
 5899 Jedicke
 5900 Jensen
 
 
 5905 Johnson
 
 
 
 
 
 
 
 
 
 
 
 
 
 
 
 
 
 
 
 
 
 
 
 
 
 
 
 
 
 
 
 
 
 
 
 
 
 5951 Alicemonet

See also 
 List of minor planet discoverers
 List of observatory codes

References

External links 
 Discovery Circumstances: Numbered Minor Planets, Minor Planet Center

Lists of minor planets by name